Ó Cionga was the name of an Irish Brehon family of Lough Ree, County Westmeath, who spread to neighbouring areas such as County Longford and County Offaly.

See also

 Tomas O Cinga, died 1342
 Muircheartach Ó Cionga, Old Testament translator and scribe, c. 1562-c.1639.

External links
 http://www.irishtimes.com/ancestor/surname/index.cfm?fuseaction=Go.&UserID=

References

 Dictionary of Irish Biography, volume five, pp. 209–210, Cambridge, 2009.

Surnames
Irish families
Irish Brehon families
Surnames of Irish origin
Irish-language surnames
Families of Irish ancestry